Vəliuşağı (also, Veliushagy and Veliushakhly) is a village and municipality in the Barda Rayon of Azerbaijan.  It has a population of 420.

References

Populated places in Barda District